Tech Crags is a narrow broken ridge 2 nautical miles (3.7 km) south of Williams Cliff on Ross Island, Antarctica. The feature rises to c.1000 m and marks a declivity along the north flank of broad Turks Head Ridge, from which ice moves to Pukaru Icefalls. Named by Advisory Committee on Antarctic Names (US-ACAN) (2000) after the New Mexico Institute of Mining and Technology, known as New Mexico Tech. From 1981, many Tech students under the direction of Philip R. Kyle, have undertaken graduate research projects (thesis and dissertation) on Mount Erebus, Ross Island.

Ridges of Ross Island